The Métis Nation British Columbia (MNBC), formerly Métis Provincial Council of British Columbia, is the only federally recognized organization representing Métis people in British Columbia, Canada. The current president-elect is Lissa Dawn Smith, the Acting Vice-president is Louis De Jaeger.

Further reading

 Andrews, G. S. Metis Outpost Memoirs of the First Schoolmaster at the Metis Settlement of Kelly Lake, B.C., 1923-1925. Victoria, B.C., Canada: G.S. Andrews, 1985. 
 Barkwell, Lawrence J., Leah Dorion, and Audreen Hourie. Métis legacy Michif culture, heritage, and folkways. Métis legacy series, v. 2. Saskatoon: Gabriel Dumont Institute, 2006. 
Barkwell, Lawrence J., Leah Dorion and Darren Prefontaine. "Metis Legacy: A Historiography and Annotated Bibliography". Winnipeg: Pemmican Publications Inc. and Saskatoon: Gabriel Dumont Institute, 2001. 
 Desjarlais, N. Colin. The Rights of the Métis in British Columbia. Vancouver: Native Programs, Legal Services Society of British Columbia, 1995. 
 Evans, Mike. What It Is to Be a Métis The Stories and Recollections of the Elders of the Prince George Métis Elders Society. Prince George, BC: UNBC Press, 1999. 
 Goulet, George and Goulet, Terry. The Metis in British Columbia: From Fur Trade Outposts to Colony. Vancouver, BC & Calgary, AB: FabJob, 2008. 
 Inkster, Rene. The Métis of British Columbia Fundamental Reading and Writing Exercises. [Victoria]: BC Ministry of Advanced Education, Training and Technology, 2001.
 Point, Leona. Metis People of Quesnel People of Mixed Heritage Living in the North Cariboo of British Columbia. Quesnel, B.C.: Quesnel Tillicum Society], 1994.

External links
 Métis Nation British Columbia official website

Indigenous organizations in British Columbia
Métis organizations
Indigenous rights organizations in Canada

Métis in British Columbia